Ermischiella bejceki is a species of beetle in the genus Ermischiella. It was described in 2012.

References

Mordellidae
Beetles described in 2012